Welcome to Chippendales is an American biographical drama miniseries created by Robert Siegel inspired by the book Deadly Dance: The Chippendales Murders by K. Scot Macdonald and Patrick MontesDeOca. It stars Kumail Nanjiani as Somen "Steve" Banerjee, the founder of Chippendales.

Welcome to Chippendales premiered on November 22, 2022 on Hulu.

Premise
The tale of Steve Banerjee, an Indian immigrant seeking the American dream, is chronicled in this true crime series laced with murder and sex. He builds the largest and first male strip joint, Chippendales, only to burn it down in less than ten years and wind up being an accessory to murder.

Cast and characters

Main
 Kumail Nanjiani as Somen "Steve" Banerjee
 Murray Bartlett as Nick De Noia
 Annaleigh Ashford as Irene
 Juliette Lewis as Denise

Recurring
 Quentin Plair as Otis
 Andrew Rannells as Bradford Barton
 Robin de Jesús as Ray Colon
 Spencer Boldman as Lance McCrae

Guest
 Nicola Peltz as Dorothy Stratten
 Dan Stevens as Paul Snider

Episodes

Production

Development
In May 2021, it was announced Hulu had given the series a straight-to-series order, with Robert Siegel, Rajiv Joseph and Mehar Sethi serving as writers. In October 2021, it was announced Ramin Bahrani would direct and executive produce the series, with Jenni Konner joining as an executive producer. In February 2022, it was announced Matt Shakman would replace Bahrani as director and executive producer.

Casting
Upon the initial announcement, Kumail Nanjiani was announced to star in the series. Nanjiani was first offered a role in the series in 2017, but at the time wasn't sure if he wanted to play a "bad guy" Indian immigrant. By the time the project came back around a few years later, he had a different perspective, and was more open to portraying such a character. In January 2022, Murray Bartlett, and Annaleigh Ashford joined the cast of the series. In February, Dan Stevens was announced as another series regular, with Quentin Plair and Andrew Rannells in a recurring capacity, and Nicola Peltz as a guest star. In March, Robin de Jesús and Juliette Lewis joined the cast in recurring and series regular roles, respectively. In April, Spencer Boldman joined the cast in a recurring capacity.

Filming
Principal photography began by March 2022, with production briefly paused due to a positive COVID-19 test.

Music
The score was composed by Siddhartha Khosla. The album was released on December 30, 2022.

Release
The series was released on November 22, 2022 on Hulu. Internationally, Welcome to Chippendales premiered on Disney+ via the Star hub and in Star+ in Latin America and on Disney+ Hotstar. The series premiered on Disney+ in Sub-Saharan Africa on January 11, 2023.

Reception

Critical response
The review aggregator website Rotten Tomatoes reported a 75% approval rating with an average rating of 7.5/10, based on 32 critic reviews. The website's critics consensus reads, "Blessed with a twisty true story that needs little embellishment to intrigue, Welcome to Chippendales details the battle over a beefcake empire with stylistic verve." Metacritic, which uses a weighted average, assigned a score of 67 out of 100 based on 18 critics, indicating "generally favorable reviews".

Accolades
Murray Bartlett has been nominated for Best Supporting Actor in a Limited Series or Movie Made for Television for the 28th Critics' Choice Awards.

References

External links
 
 

2020s American drama television miniseries
2022 American television series debuts
2023 American television series endings
American biographical series
English-language television shows
Hulu original programming
Television series based on actual events
Television series by 20th Century Fox Television